Niklaus Dachselhofer (18 November 1595 – 12 February 1670, sometimes given as "Daxelhofer") was a Swiss politician in Bern. He became a member of the canton's Grand Council in 1628 and one year later also a member of the city council (Kleiner Rat). From 1636 to 1667 he was Schultheiss (mayor) of Berne.

References
 URl last accessed 2006-12-18.

1595 births
1670 deaths
17th-century Swiss people
Swiss politicians
People from Bern